Henri Delauze (born May 6, 1997) is a male sprinter from Freeport, Bahamas who mainly competes in the 400m. He attended Bishop Michael Eldon School on Grand Bahama Island before going on to compete for Miami Hurricanes and Embry-Riddle University.

Delauze has won multiple CARIFTA Games medals.

Personal bests

References

External links
 World Athletics Bio
 Embry Riddle Bio
 Hurricanes Bio

1997 births
Living people
Bahamian male sprinters
People from Freeport, Bahamas
Athletes (track and field) at the 2014 Summer Youth Olympics